Castanopsis fulva is a tree in the beech family Fagaceae. The specific epithet  is from the Latin meaning "tawny", referring to the indumentum.

Description
The bark is smooth or fissured.

Distribution and habitat
Castanopsis fulva grows naturally in Borneo, Peninsular Malaysia and Sumatra. Its habitat is hill dipterocarp and kerangas  forests up to  altitude.

References

fulva
Trees of Borneo
Trees of Peninsular Malaysia
Trees of Sumatra
Plants described in 1914
Flora of the Borneo lowland rain forests